UFC on Fox: Machida vs. Rockhold (also known as UFC on Fox 15) was a mixed martial arts event held on April 18, 2015, at the Prudential Center in Newark, New Jersey.

Background
The event was the sixth event that the UFC has hosted in Newark, New Jersey and was headlined by a middleweight bout between former UFC Light Heavyweight champion Lyoto Machida and former Strikeforce Middleweight champion Luke Rockhold.

Manvel Gamburyan was expected to face Aljamain Sterling at the event. However, on February 3, Gamburyan pulled out of the bout citing injury and was replaced by Takeya Mizugaki.

A middleweight bout between Ronaldo Souza and Yoel Romero was originally booked for UFC 184. However, the bout was cancelled due to Souza being struck with pneumonia. The fight was later rescheduled for this event. However, on April 10, Romero pulled out of the bout due to a ligament and meniscus tear in his knee. On the next day, Chris Camozzi was announced as his replacement. The fight was a rematch as Souza defeated Camozzi by technical submission (arm-triangle choke) at UFC on FX: Belfort vs. Rockhold.

A featherweight bout between Diego Brandão and Jimy Hettes was originally booked for UFC 183. However, the bout was canceled right before the event started, as Hettes passed out backstage. The fight was later rescheduled for this event.

George Sullivan was expected to face Kenny Robertson at the event. However, Robertson pulled out of the bout citing injury and was replaced by Tim Means.

Nick Catone was expected to face Vitor Miranda at the event. However, Catone abruptly announced his retirement on March 25, citing a litany of injuries and a history of chronic back pain. With a rib injury, Miranda was also pulled from the card.

Paul Felder was expected to face Jim Miller at this event. However, Felder was forced to pull out of the event due to a knee injury and was replaced by Beneil Dariush.

Results

Bonus awards
The following fighters were awarded $50,000 bonuses:

Fight of the Night: Gian Villante vs. Corey Anderson
Performance of the Night: Luke Rockhold and Max Holloway

See also
List of UFC events
2015 in UFC

References

Fox UFC
Events in Newark, New Jersey
Mixed martial arts in New Jersey
Sports competitions in Newark, New Jersey
2015 in mixed martial arts
April 2015 sports events in the United States